The 2006–07 Icelandic Hockey League season was the 16th season of the Icelandic Hockey League, the top level of ice hockey in Iceland. Three teams participated in the league, and Skautafelag Reykjavikur won the championship.

Regular season

Final
 Skautafélag Reykjavíkur - Skautafélag Akureyrar 3:2 (2:5, 8:4, 1:2, 4:3, 3:2 n.P.)

Icelandic Hockey League
Icelandic Hockey League seasons
2006–07 in Icelandic ice hockey